Rutschman is a surname. Notable people with the surname include:

Ad Rutschman (born 1931), American football coach, former baseball coach, and college athletics administrator
Adley Rutschman (born 1998), American college baseball player